Montmagny Seamount, formerly known as Minia Seamount, is an undersea mountain in the North Atlantic Ocean, located about  south of Cape Race in Canadian waters off Atlantic Canada.

Montmagny is one of the seven named Fogo Seamounts. It was originally named Minia Seamount after a Canadian cable ship that helped search for bodies from the Titanic disaster. However, this name had already been in use for a seamount further to the northeast and was therefore renamed in 1997 to Montmagny Seamount after the Canadian steamship SS Montmagny. This steamship participated in two recovery missions after the Titanic disaster.

References

External links

Fogo Seamounts